Superintendent of Documents Classification, commonly called as SuDocs or SuDoc, is a system of library classification developed and maintained by the United States Government Publishing Office. Unlike Library of Congress Classification, Dewey Decimal Classification, or Universal Decimal Classification, SuDocs is not a universal system. Rather, it is intended for use only with publications of the Federal Government of the United States.

SuDocs call numbers are assigned by the Government Publishing Office as new publications are produced. Many libraries that participate in the Federal Depository Library Program employ SuDocs to classify their collections.

History 
Superintendent of Documents Classification took form around 1891, when Adelaide Hasse was given the task of organizing the government publications held at the Los Angeles Public Library. Rather than organize publications by subject, she instead organized them by provenance, that is, the government agency that issued them. Hasse applied the system she developed to a list of publications of the Department of Agriculture in 1895. Her system was adopted by the office of the Superintendent of Documents in 1895. William Leander Post, head of the Government Printing Office's Public Documents Library, assigned new symbols for government agencies, allowing for the expansion of the system to accommodate all federal agencies.

Structure 
SuDocs call numbers consist of two main parts: a class stem, and a suffix. The class stem brings together related publications, while the suffix is a unique identifier for a publication. The example below breaks down the part of a SuDocs call number using the example of Cybersecurity: deterrence policy, with the call number LC 14.23:R 47011.

Departments and agencies 
Departments and agencies are assigned letter author symbols. As of 2022, the following letter author symbols are in use:

X and Y  are used for the United States Congress. Boards and agencies created by Congress (as opposed to by the Executive Branch) are assigned call numbers beginning with Y 3, and publications of congressional committees are assigned call numbers beginning with Y 4.

Subordinate offices 
Subordinate offices are designated by numbers. The number 1 is reserved for the parent agency, while later numbers are used for subordinate bureaus and offices. For example, I 1 designates the main office of the Department of the Interior, while I 19 designates the United States Geological Survey, I 29 designates the National Park Service, and I 33 designates the U.S. Board on Geographic Names. These latter three examples are all divisions of the Department of the Interior.

Subordinate office numbers generally range from 1-99, although the Department of Defense uses higher numbers. There is a space between the letter author symbol and the subordinate office.

Category classes 
Category classes are used to group together the types of publications that federal agencies commonly issue. The numbers 1-14 are reserved for the most commonly created publications:

 Annual reports
 General publications (i.e. publications that do not fall into other classes and which are not part of series)
 Bulletins
 Circulars
 Laws
 Regulations, rules, and instructions
 Press releases
 Handbooks, manuals, and guides
 Bibliographies and lists of publications
 Directories
 Maps and charts
 Posters
 Forms
 Addresses

Numbers after 14 are assigned to series. Publications in the series CRS Reports are assigned the number 23, as shown in the example above.

Book numbers 
The final component of the call number is the book number. Depending on the type of publication, this may be a Cutter number, a volume number, or some other special designation reserved for the series in question.

Related classification systems 

The Canadian equivalent of SuDocs is the CODOC system, which was created in 1966 at the University of Guelph. A number of U.S. states, including Arizona, Colorado, and North Carolina employ similar provenance-based classification systems to organize their state publications.

References

External Links 

 Superintendent of Documents Classification Guidelines from the Federal Depository Library Program

Library cataloging and classification